Sander Pieter Zwegers (born April 16, 1975 in Oosterhout) is a Dutch mathematician who made a connection between Maass forms and Srinivasa Ramanujan's mock theta functions in 2002. After a period at the Max-Planck Institute in Bonn, he became an assistant professor at the University College Dublin in 2008. Since 2011, he has been is professor of number theory at the  University of Cologne.

Research
In 1976, the American mathematician George Andrews found what is nowadays known as the “Lost Notebook” of Ramanujan. It contains many remarkable results, including the mysterious mock theta functions.
This notebook contains what many specialists regard as Ramanujan’s deepest work. It was Sander Zwegers who, as a PdD student, had groundbreaking ideas how to fit the mock theta functions into a broader context. His 2002 PhD thesis has led to numerous publications and international conferences.

Zwegers' general area of interest is number theory. More specifically, he studies modular forms and variations thereof, such as Maass forms, mock modular forms, (indefinite) theta functions, and (Maass) Jacobi forms.

Works

References

External links
 Home Page at the University of Cologne
 

1975 births
21st-century Dutch mathematicians
Living people
Number theorists
People from Oosterhout